Victor Lukyanovich Vuyachich  (July 11, 1934 in Kharkiv, Ukrainian SSR, USSR – September 17, 1999 in Minsk, Belarus) was a Belarusian Soviet crooner. He was a winner of Soviet All-Union competitions as well as international competitions. Vuyachich was awarded the honorary title of People's Artist of Belarus.

Vuyachich's repertoire was rich and varied, including pop songs, patriotic songs, opera arias, and old romances. For many years he collaborated with several Belarusian composers. Belarusian pop music was important in his work. Vuyachich toured the Soviet Union and performed around the world.

After 1991, Vuyachich performed almost solely in Belarus, cooperating with state radio and the Belarusian State Philharmonic.

References

External links
 Тот самый Вуячич
  Музыкальный конкурс «Золотой Шлягер»

1934 births
1999 deaths
Soviet male singers
20th-century Belarusian male singers
Musicians from Kharkiv
People's Artists of Belarus